Black the Sun is the debut studio album by the Australian singer–songwriter Alex Lloyd, released in July 1999 via EMI Records.

At the ARIA Music Awards of 2000, the album, won ARIA Award for Best Male Artist.

Critical reception 

Black the Sun received critical acclaim. Triple J listeners voting it their album of the year in 1999. Writing for The Guardian in September 2000, John Aizlewood compared Lloyd's "eclectic approach" and "inspired turn of phrase" to that of Beck, and stated that the album "yields more with each play". He went on to draw comparison with the music of Crowded House, and singled out "Black the Sun", "What a Year" and "Backseat Clause" as the album's highlights, the latter, he noted, is a track which "closes the album in stark, lonesome fashion".

Track listing 
All tracks written by A. Wasiliev, except where noted.

 "Melting"
 "Momo"
 "Something Special" (A. Wasiliev/S. Miller)
 "Desert"
 "Snow"
 "My Way Home"
 "Black The Sun"
 "Lucky Star"
 "What A Year" (A. Wasiliev/B. Quinn)
 "Faraway"
 "Aliens" 
 "Gender"
 "Backseat Clause"

Personnel 
 Alex Lloyd – co-producer, guitar, vocals, programming, drums, bass

Additional musicians
 Louise Morgan – spoken word
 Trent Williamson – programming, harmonica
 Terapai Richmond – drums
 Daniel Denholm – string arrangement, vocal arrangement
 Clayton Doley – organ

Technical personnel
 Ed Buller – co-producer, programming
 Trent Williamson – co-producer

Charts

Weekly charts

Year-end charts

Certification

References 

1999 debut albums
Alex Lloyd albums
ARIA Award-winning albums